Constantino Scarpetta (born 6 April 1977) is a Paraguayan sailor. He competed in the Laser event at the 1996 Summer Olympics.

References

External links
 

1977 births
Living people
Paraguayan male sailors (sport)
Olympic sailors of Paraguay
Sailors at the 1996 Summer Olympics – Laser
Place of birth missing (living people)
20th-century Paraguayan people